Cross-country skiing at the 1996 Winter Asian Games took place in the city of Harbin, China with six events contested — three each for men and women.

Medalists

Men

Women

Medal table

References
 
 Results

 
1996 Asian Winter Games events
1996
Asian Winter Games